Oberea donceeli is a species of beetle in the family Cerambycidae. It was described by Maurice Pic in 1907. It is known from China, Mongolia and Russia.

References

donceeli
Beetles described in 1907